George Napier (1751–1804) was a British Army officer.

George Napier may also refer to:

 George Thomas Napier (1784–1855), George Napier's son, also a British Army officer, Governor of the Cape
 George Napper  (1550–1610) or Napier, English Roman Catholic priest and martyr
 George M. Napier (1863–1932), Attorney General of Georgia